8 × 8: A Chess Sonata in 8 Movements (1957) is an American experimental film directed by Hans Richter, with contributing work by Marcel Duchamp and Jean Cocteau that was released on March 15, 1957, in New York City. It features original music by Robert Abramson, John Gruen and Douglas Townsend.

Described by Richter as "part Freud, part Lewis Carroll", it is a fairy tale for the subconscious based on the game of chess. "8 × 8" in the title refers to the layout of a chessboard.

While living in New York, Hans Richter directed two feature films, Dreams That Money Can Buy (1947) and 8 × 8: A Chess Sonata in collaboration with Max Ernst, Cocteau, Paul Bowles, Fernand Léger, Alexander Calder, Duchamp, and others, which was partially filmed on the lawn of his summer house in Southbury, Connecticut.

Plot

Cast

See also
 List of avant-garde films of the 1950s

External links 

1957 films
Films about chess
Films directed by Hans Richter
American avant-garde and experimental films
Marcel Duchamp works
1950s American films